The Checkout was an Australian consumer affairs television series. The show's first series of 10 episodes premiered on 21 March 2013 on the Australian Broadcasting Corporation (ABC) television station ABC TV. A second series consisting of 16 episodes commenced airing on 20 February 2014. On 9 April 2015, a third series consisting of 12 episodes began airing. The series was renewed for a fourth series, which began airing on 7 April 2016 consisting of 12 episodes. The series returned for a fifth series, airing twelve episodes between 6 April 2017 and 29 June 2017. The Checkout, with a new look, logo, opening theme and art, still retaining original cast and segments, returned for a sixth season on 30 January 2018.

In July 2018, the series was cancelled, with the ABC's head of non-scripted production citing "budget cuts and the relatively high cost of making the show" as the reason for its cancellation.

Premise
The Checkout features segments that examine the practices and methods of manufacturers, retailers, service providers and advertisers. Using a humorous style, the show highlights practices that are misleading, dishonest, unfair or occasionally even illegal or unethical. Often segments will target types of services or products rather than individual brands or companies. Examples include a segment on overpriced Wi-Fi services offered in certain hotels, the lack of scientific proof for the health benefits claimed by manufacturers of complementary medicines, and the concept of peer-to-peer lending.

Some segments take aim at specific brands and companies. One example was directed at Cadbury and their Joyville campaign which promoted a 10% increase (from 200gm to 220gm) in the size of the family blocks of chocolate which The Checkout portrayed as ironic given that Cadbury had previously reduced the blocks by 20% from 250gm to 200gm. Another was on Anaconda Mountain Bikes which are sold as such but are actually built for road-use only.

The show also includes the segment 'F U Tube' that allow viewers to upload their own queries or complaints about goods or services they have purchased. The program is associated with Choice magazine.

Series overview

Lawsuits
The ABC was sued by Avni Sali for defamation over a segment on Swisse products. The ABC stood by the segment. Justice David Beach refused to strike out the case, finding that it was "not without real prospects of success". The matter eventually settled out of court.

The ABC also faced legal action over a segment on A2 milk with the a2 Milk Company claiming that the segment contains a number of "inaccuracies, misrepresentations and omissions". The A2 Milk company's case was based on the Competition and Consumer Act which does not typically apply to the ABC. However, the company argued that "advertising for the program constitutes 'engaging in commerce'."

Reception
Paul McIntyre at AdNews wrote in 2014 that the show had "blown up marketing's new world order".

Juliette Hughes at the Australian Catholic Office for broadcasting wrote (in 2013) "The Checkout retains some of the verve and righteous anger of The Chaser, indeed could almost be said to be knocking over a few of the moneychangers' tables in what passes for today's secular temples, the premises ....of revered corporations."

Gordon Farrer, for The Sydney Morning Herald, wrote, "Typical bloody lefty pinko commie ABC, launching yet another assault on Things That Good People Hold Dear.....Humph. If you accept The Checkout view of the world, marketing and advertising are industries out of control, full of charlatans, unfair restrictions on consumers, misrepresentation and outright lies about products of less-than-essential value to human existence."

Nominations
The Super Foods segment in an episode of the first series of The Checkout was a finalist in the 2013 Eureka Prize for Scientific Journalism. The segment investigated foods promoted as ultra-healthy.

The Checkout was nominated for Best Light Entertainment Television Series at the 4th AACTA Awards, and for Most Outstanding Entertainment Program at the 2015 Logie Awards.

DVD releases
The Complete Series 1 and 2 box set was released on 3 December 2014.

References

External links

The Checkout : ABC TV

Australian Broadcasting Corporation original programming
Australian comedy television series
2013 Australian television series debuts
2018 Australian television series endings
The Chaser
Consumer protection television series